The Outer Ring Road is a under construction  6 lane access-controlled expressway ring road encircling the city of Kanpur, Uttar Pradesh, India. It will start from Mandhana on Kanpur Aligarh Highway and will pass through Kanpur Jhansi/Agra Highway at Sachendi, Hamirpur Road near Ramaipur, Allahabad Highway at Maharajpur, from there it will cross Ganga river near Chakeri Airport (where a connecting road is also proposed) and reach Unnao district where it will connect Raebareli Highway and under construction Kanpur Lucknow Expressway further it will pass through Kanpur Lucknow Highway and Trans Ganga City and will again enter Kanpur district by crossing Ganga river  between Ganga Bairaj and Bithoor and end at Mandhana forming a circle. 

It will cost about ₹5,182 crore. On 11 September 2021, NHAI has issued notification for acquiring land for 22.5km first phase of ring road.The first phase will be between Mandhana and Sachendi whereby land of 79 villages will be acquired.In total there will be four phases and notification for land acquisition of other 3 phases will be issued soon.

Status updates
 Aug 2019: PWD department have done survey and costing estimates.
 Aug 2020: Uttar Pradesh Government to prepare new alignment and new detailed project report whereby the length of ring road could get shortened.
June 2021: Project approved by NHAI. 
July 2021: Survey for land acquisition is expected to start from August-end.
August 2021: Work for making of Detail Project Report started.
September 2021: Notification for 1st phase land acquisition issued by NHAI.

See also
 National Highway 230 (India)

References

Transport in Kanpur
Ring roads in India
Proposed roads in India